Cacaopera is an extinct language belonging to the Misumalpan family, formerly spoken in the department of Morazán in El Salvador by the Cacaopera people. It was closely related to Matagalpa, and slightly more distantly to Sumo, but was geographically separated from other Misumalpan languages.

The last semi-speakers of Cacaopera lived in the 1970s. All native speakers had died before this time.

Phonology

Consonants

Vowels

References

External links 
 Recording of a semi-speaker of Cacaopera from 1973, from the MesoAmerican Languages Collection of Lyle Campbell at the Archive of the Indigenous Languages of Latin America.

Misumalpan languages
Languages of El Salvador
Extinct languages of North America
Languages extinct in the 20th century